Mona Thiba is a Gujarati film actress from Gujarat, India. She has also acted in Hindi and Bhojpuri films. She started her acting career in 2000.

She married actor-politician Hitu Kanodia on 14 August 2014 in Ahmedabad. They have a son, Rajveer, born in 2016.

Filmography

 Dikri No Mandvo
 Gago Ke'dada Nu Painu Painu Karto'to
 Baap Dhamaal Dikra Kamaal
 Ab To Banja Sajanwa Hamaar (Bhojpuri)
 Kanku Purayu Maa Amba Na Chowk Ma
 Tohar Kiriya (Bhojpuri)
 "Aasude bhinjaye gharchholu aasude bhinjaye chunadi" (Gujarati) 
 "Himmatwala" (Hindi) (Special appearance in song "Dhoka Dhoka")
 "Rama Rama Kya Hai Dramaa?" (Hindi)  (As Shivani) 
 "Mota bha" (Gujarati)
 "Gabbar singh (2008 )(As Basanti) " (Bhojpuri)
 "Himmatwala (2013) (Hindi) (Special appearance in the song "Dhoka Dhoka")

References

External links
 

Living people
Indian film actresses
Gujarati people
People from Gujarat
Actresses in Gujarati cinema
21st-century Indian actresses
Year of birth missing (living people)
Kanodia family